Out of Focus may refer to:

Film and TV
Out of Focus, Israeli TV youth series featuring Moran Atias and others
Out of Focus, Israeli dance film directed by Tomer Heymann 2007

Music
Out of Focus (band), German band of 1970s
Out of Focus (EP), first solo project of Hip-Hop rapper eLZhi, which has never been officially released
"Out of Focus", jazz duet by Charlie Hadden from The Golden Number 1976
"Out of Focus", song by Mick Jagger from Wandering Spirit (album) 1993